Teresa Helena Higginson (27 May 1844 – 15 February 1905) was a British Roman Catholic mystic.

Life
Higginson was born in Holywell, Flintshire, United Kingdom in 1844 where her parents were staying whilst on pilgrimage to the shrine of St. Winefride. Her father Robert Francis Higginson was a Catholic and his wife was a convert. Higginson went to a convent school in Nottingham, and became a schoolteacher at Bootle.

During her life Higginson's hands and feet bled in a way known as stigmata, she went into prayer trances that lasted days, and she "violently re-enacted" the scenes in the Stations of the Cross.

Higginson died in Chudleigh and was declared a Servant of God in 1937.

Legacy
Higginson was discussed as a possible candidate for canonization in 1928. Many letters written by Higginson are in the archives at St Augustine's Abbey, Ramsgate, with duplicates at the Metropolitan Cathedral of Christ the King Liverpool.

References

External links 
 bnf.fr

1844 births
1905 deaths
19th-century venerated Christians
20th-century venerated Christians
British women
People from Holywell, Flintshire
Servants of God
Stigmatics
English Roman Catholics
Women letter writers